Men's 200m races for blind & visually impaired athletes at the 2004 Summer Paralympics were held in the Athens Olympic Stadium. Events were held in three disability classes.

T11

The T11 event consisted of 5 heats, 3 semifinals and A & B finals. It was won by Jose Armando Sayovo, representing .

1st Round

Heat 1
23 Sept. 2004, 11:25

Heat 2
23 Sept. 2004, 11:31

Heat 3
23 Sept. 2004, 11:37

Heat 4
23 Sept. 2004, 11:43

Heat 5
23 Sept. 2004, 11:49

Semifinals
Heat 1
23 Sept. 2004, 21:55

Heat 2
23 Sept. 2004, 22:01

Heat 3
23 Sept. 2004, 22:07

Final Round
Final A
24 Sept. 2004, 17:40

Final B
24 Sept. 2004, 17:30

T12

The T12 event consisted of 7 heats, 3 semifinals and A & B finals. It was won by Adekundo Adesoji, representing .

1st Round

Heat 1
24 Sept. 2004, 11:35

Heat 2
24 Sept. 2004, 11:41

Heat 3
24 Sept. 2004, 11:47

Heat 4
24 Sept. 2004, 11:53

Heat 5
24 Sept. 2004, 11:59

Heat 6
24 Sept. 2004, 12:05

Heat 7
24 Sept. 2004, 12:11

Semifinals
Heat 1
25 Sept. 2004, 12:00

Heat 2
25 Sept. 2004, 12:06

Heat 3
25 Sept. 2004, 12:12

Final Round
Final A
26 Sept. 2004, 19:51

Final B
26 Sept. 2004, 19:45

T13

The T13 event consisted of 2 heats and a final. It was won by Andre Andrade, representing .

1st Round

Heat 1
19 Sept. 2004, 17:30

Heat 2
19 Sept. 2004, 17:36

Final Round
20 Sept. 2004, 18:00

References

M